North Daviess Junior Senior High School is a high school located near Elnora, Indiana.  Its athletic nickname is the "Cougars", and it participates in the Southwestern Indiana Conference.  In the 2008-2009 ISTEP ranking, North Daviess placed 60th in the state.  It was established in 1968 as a consolidation of the Elnora Owls, Odon Bulldogs, Raglesville Rockets, Plainville Midgets and the Epsom Salts.

Sports
North Daviess competes in the smallest level in the Indiana High School Athletic Association, 1A.  North Daviess has won a state title in boys basketball, semi-state in softball and girls’ golf, and regionals in softball, boys' basketball, girls' basketball, girls' golf, cross country, track, and baseball. 

Because of the IHSAA's Tournament Success rule, North Daviess currently competes in class 2A in Volleyball and Girls Basketball, and in 3A in Boys Basketball. This is because of the aforementioned state titles and repeated appearances at state, all in recent years.

See also
 List of high schools in Indiana
 Southwestern Indiana Conference
 Elnora, Indiana

References

External links
http://www.ndaviess.k12.in.us/vnews/display.v/SEC/Jr/Sr%20High%20School
http://www.schooldigger.com/go/IN/schoolrank.aspx?level=3

Public high schools in Indiana
High schools in Southwestern Indiana
Schools in Daviess County, Indiana